John Albert Whitaker (October 31, 1901 – December 15, 1951) was a U.S. Representative from Kentucky.

Whitaker was born in Russellville, Kentucky.  He attended the public schools, Bethel College, and the University of Kentucky.  He later studied law, attained admitted to the bar in 1926, and commenced practice in Russellville.

He was Logan County Attorney from 1928 to 1948, and a delegate to all the State Democratic conventions from 1924 to 1950.

Whitaker was elected as a Democrat to the Eightieth Congress to fill the vacancy caused by the resignation of Earle C. Clements.  He was reelected to the Eighty-first and Eighty-second Congresses and served from April 17, 1948, until his death in Russellville, Kentucky, December 15, 1951.

He was interred in Russellville's Maple Grove Cemetery.

Whitaker was the grandson of Addison James, who also served in Congress.

See also
 List of United States Congress members who died in office (1950–99)

References

1901 births
1951 deaths
Bethel College (Kentucky) alumni
University of Kentucky alumni
Democratic Party members of the United States House of Representatives from Kentucky
20th-century American politicians